The Top 100 Contractors Report on the Federal Procurement Data System lists the top 100 defense contractors by sales to the United States Armed Forces and Department of Defense. ('DoD 9700' worksheet). The Department of Defense announces contracts valued at $7 million or more each business day at 5 pm.  All defense contractors maintain CAGE (Commercial and Government Entity) Codes and are profiled in the System for Award Management (SAM).

List of Top 100 United States defense contractors
 Academi
 Action Target
 ADT Corporation
 Advanced Armament Corporation
 AECOM
 Aerojet
 Aerospace Corporation
 Aerovironment
 AirScan
 AM General
 American Petroleum Institute
 Argon ST
 ARINC
 Artis
 Assett
 Astronautics Corporation of America
 Atec
 Aurora Flight Sciences
 Axon Enterprise
 BAE Systems
 BAE Systems Inc
 Ball Corporation
 Ball Aerospace & Technologies
 Barrett Firearms Manufacturing
 Battelle Memorial Institute
 Bechtel
 Berico Technologies
 Boeing Company
 Insitu
 Booz Allen Hamilton
 Boston Dynamics
 Bravo Strategic
 CACI
 Carlyle Group
 Carnegie Mellon University
 Ceradyne
 Cloudera
 Colt Defense
 The Columbia Group
 Computer Sciences Corporation
 Concurrent Technologies Corporation
 CSRA (IT services company)
 Cubic Corporation
 Omega Training Group
 Curtiss-Wright
 DeciBel Research
 Dillon Aero
 Dine Development Corporation
 Draper Laboratories
 DRS Technologies
 DynCorp
 Edison Welding Institute
 Elbit Systems
 M7 Aerospace
 Ensco
/ Ernst & Young
 Evergreen International Aviation
 Exxon
 Fluor Corporation
 Force Protection Inc
 Foster-Miller
 Foster Wheeler
 Franklin Armoury
 General Atomics
 General Dynamics
 Bath Iron Works
 General Dynamics Electric Boat
 Gulfstream
 Vangent
 General Electric Military Jet Engines Division
 Goodrich Corporation
 Halliburton Corporation
 Health Net
 Hewlett-Packard
 Honeywell
 Humana Inc.
 Huntington Ingalls Industries
 Hybricon Corporation
 IBM
 Insight Technology
 Intelsat
 International Resources Group
 iRobot
 ITT Exelis
 Jacobs Engineering Group
 JANUS Research Group
 Johns Hopkins University
 Kaman Aircraft
 KBR
 Kearfott Corporation
 Knight's Armament Company
 Kratos Defense & Security Solutions
 L3Harris Technologies
 Brashear
/ Lafayette Praetorian Group
 Lake Shore Systems
 Leidos
 EOTech
 Lewis Machine & Tool Company
 Lockheed Martin
 Gyrocam Systems
 Sikorsky
 LRAD Corporation
 ManTech International
 Maxar Technologies
 McQ
 Microsoft
 Mission Essential Personnel
 Motorola
 Natel Electronic Manufacturing Services
 Navistar Defense
 Nextel
 Northrop Grumman Corporation
 Northrop Grumman Electronic Systems
 Northrop Grumman Ship Systems
 Northrop Grumman Technical Services
 NOVA
 Oceaneering International
 Olin Corporation; also see John M. Olin and John M. Olin Foundation
 Orbital ATK
 Oshkosh Corporation
 Para-Ordnance
 Perot Systems
 Picatinny Arsenal
 Pinnacle Armor
 Precision Castparts Corporation
 Raytheon
 BBN Technologies
 Remington Arms
 Rock Island Arsenal
 Rockwell Collins
 Roundhill Group
 Ruger
 Saab Sensis
 Science Applications International Corporation (SAIC)
 SGIS
 Sierra Nevada Corporation
 Smith & Wesson
 Smith Enterprise (SEI)
 SPRATA
 Springfield Armory
 SRC Inc
 SRI International
 Stanley
 Stewart & Stevenson
 Swift Engineering
 Tactical Air Support
 Teledyne
 Teledyne FLIR
 Textron
 AAI Corporation
 Bell Helicopter Textron
 Trijicon
 TriWest Healthcare Alliance
 Unisys
 United Technologies
 Pratt & Whitney
 URS Corporation
 Washington Group International
 U.S. Ordnance
 Verizon Communications
 Vinnell Corporation
 Westinghouse Electric Corporation

See also
Government contractor
List of private military companies
:Category:Private military contractors
Top 100 US Federal Contractors

References

External links
 private business of military suppliers and contractors

Defense contractors
Private military contractors